The 2021–22 Erste Liga was a season of the Erste Liga. The league's title sponsor was Erste Group. The defending champions were HSC Csíkszereda.

Teams

Regular season

Play-offs

Bracket

Wild card round

Quarterfinals

Semifinals

Finals

Final rankings

References

External links

Erste Liga (ice hockey) seasons
2021–22 in European ice hockey leagues
2021–22 in Hungarian ice hockey
2021–22 in Romanian ice hockey
2021–22 in Austrian ice hockey